The 1961 European Ladies' Team Championship took place 22–27 September on the Circolo Golf Villa D'Este outside Como, Italy. It was the second ladies' amateur golf European Ladies' Team Championship.

Venue 
The course, situated 4 kilometres south-east of Como, Lombardy region, the seventh oldest golf course in Italy, was designed by Peter Gannon and opened in 1926.

The championship course was set up with par 69.

Format 
All participating teams played two qualification rounds of stroke play, counting the three best scores out of up to four players for each team. The four best teams formed flight A. The next four teams formed flight B.

The winner in each flight was determined by a round-robin system. All teams in the flight met each other and the team with most points for team matches in flight A won the tournament, using the scale, win=2 points, halved=1 point, lose=0 points. In each match between two nation teams, two foursome games and four single games were played.

Teams 
Eight nation teams contested the event. Each team consisted of a minimum of four players. Spain and Portugal took part for the first time.

Players in some of the teams

Other participating teams

Winners 
Defending champions team France won the championship, earning 6 points in flight A. Host nation Italy earned second place, just as they did at the previous championship two years earlier.

Individual winner in the opening 36-hole stroke play qualifying competition was Mercedes Etchart de Ártiach, Spain, with a score of 4-over-par 142.

Results 
Qualification rounds

Team standings

* Note: In the event of a tie the order was determined by the better non-counting score.

Individual leader

 Note: There was no official recognition for the lowest individual score.

Flight A

Team matches

Team standings

Flight B

Team matches

* Note: Sweden was given walkover in three games against the Netherlands and in two games against then West Germany, due to food poisoning.

Team standings

Final standings

Sources:

See also 
 Espirito Santo Trophy – biennial world amateur team golf championship for women organized by the International Golf Federation.
 European Amateur Team Championship – European amateur team golf championship for men organised by the European Golf Association.

References

External links 
 European Golf Association: Results

European Ladies' Team Championship
Golf tournaments in Italy
European Ladies' Team Championship
European Ladies' Team Championship
European Ladies' Team Championship